Slovenia–Ukraine relations are bilateral relations between Ukraine and Slovenia.

Slovenia recognized Ukraine's independence on December 11, 1991, and diplomatic relations were established three months later, on March 10, 1992. In 2004, in Ljubljana, Ukraine opened the Embassy of Ukraine in Slovenia, the Embassy of Slovenia in Ukraine was opened in April 2004 in Kyiv, before that its task was performed by the Embassy of the Republic of Slovenia in Budapest.

See also 
 Foreign relations of Ukraine
 Foreign relations of Slovenia

References

External links 
 
 

 
Ukraine
Bilateral relations of Ukraine